The word "type" followed by a number is a common way to name a weapon or product in a production series, similar in meaning to "mark". "Type" was used extensively by the Japanese and Chinese militaries beginning in the 1920s, and is still in current use by the militaries of both nations. The United Kingdom uses a type number system for much of their military equipment. Many other nations use the word "type" to designate products in a series.

Japan
The Imperial Japanese Navy (IJN) began using the Type-Number System in 1921 to designate aircraft accepted for production. The numbers used after the word "Type" were based on the number of years that the Emperor Taishō had reigned. Since his reign began in 1912, an aircraft ordered into production in 1921 would have been called "Type 10", the tenth year of the emperor's reign. At the end of 1926, the emperor died, leaving his son Hirohito as the Emperor Shōwa, and the numbering system was reset to mark the new emperor's reign.

In 1929, the government of Japan adopted a new system based on the imperial year. Aircraft ordered for production from 1929 onward were assigned the last two digits of the year marking the continuity of Japanese emperors. 1929 was the 2589th imperial year, so aircraft ordered that year were designated "Type 89". 1940 was the 2600th year, and the IJN numbering system was reset to single digits. New aircraft were designated 0 (zero). The well-known Mitsubishi A6M Zero was ordered into production in 1940 as the IJN "Type 0 Carrier Fighter" (Rei shiki Kanjō sentōki, 零式艦上戦闘機), and was popularly called the "Zero" because of its type.

In 1943, the designation system was abandoned by the IJN as it was considered too revealing about the nature of the aircraft. In its place, the aircraft were named with popular terms such as Kyōfū (強風 "Strong Wind") for the Kawanishi N1K introduced in 1943.

The Imperial Japanese Army (IJA) began using the Type designation system in 1927, for all weapons, vehicles, military equipment, subassemblies and subsystems such as engines and gunmounts. In 1940, instead of resetting to zero, the IJA assigned "Type 100" to equipment put into production that year. In 1941, the IJA reset to "Type 1". Unlike the IJN, the IJA continued to use the system through 1945 with the production of the Kawasaki Ki-100 Army Type 5 Fighter.

After 1945, Japan's military changed to a numbering system based on the Japanese fiscal year which begins on April 1 in the same manner as the British fiscal year. As an example, "Type 63" was the designation for equipment such as the Type 63 AT mine accepted in 1963.

The kanji character shiki (式) is what the Japanese use to designate products in a series. The English language translation of shiki has been variously given as "model" or "type". Some manuals and texts have translated shiki as both "model" and "type" within the same publication, confusing the matter. World War II-era military dictionaries do not give shiki as the Japanese word for "model"—instead, the kanji character kata is given. In turn, kata (型 or 形) is translated as "form", "type", "pattern", "mark", or "model". The only Japanese language translation given for the English word "type" is shiki.

People's Republic of China
Chinese weapons and military vehicles are often, but not always, designated according to the Gregorian calendar, the one used by most nations. Two digits are used to designate the year. The two digits appear first, followed by the character shi, meaning "type". As examples, in 1956, the Type 56 assault rifle was put into production, and the Type 64 pistol was designed and approved in 1964.

Republic of China (Taiwan) 
The Republic of China military uses a type designation system for domestically produced small arms, light weapons, and gun based artillery. The designation of the weapon, instead of using the literal word "type", is marked with a "T" with a subsequent number corresponding to the Republic of China year (民國; Minguo) the design was finalized or had its prototype completed. As an example, the domestic Type 65 assault rifle (65式步槍) is designated T65 and had its design finalized in 1976 (Minguo year 65). The T75 squad automatic weapon, based on the FN Minimi, had its prototype completed in 1986 (Minguo year 75) and designated as such; but was continuously improved and until the design was finalized in 1992. For weapons that are copied or produced under license, the Minguo year of which it is ready for production is used; as in the case of the T57, a copy of the M14 rifle.

United Kingdom
The Royal Navy uses a type number system where blocks of numbers are reserved for specific purposes. For instance, the block 900–999 was given to naval radar sets beginning in 1945 and continuing for roughly 20 years. Numbers are not always sequential, as the Type 992 target indication radar was developed long before the Type 967 target designation radar. When a reserved block has been fully utilized, another is assigned.

See also
 Type system of the Royal Navy
 Japanese military aircraft designation systems
 Joint Electronics Type Designation System, U.S. military system
 Mark (designation)

References
Footnotes

Bibliography

Friedman, Norman. The Naval Institute guide to world naval weapons systems, 1997-1998. Naval Institute Press, 1997. 

Encodings
Military science
Technical terminology